Saint Johnstown, Delaware, USA was a stop on the now defunct Queen Anne's Railroad line between Ellendale and Greenwood. After the railroad closed down and the tracks were removed, all property owned by the railroad was returned to its previous landowners and several small towns built around the stops disappeared.

References

Former populated places in Sussex County, Delaware
Rail transportation in Delaware
Former populated places in Delaware